A patient is any person who receives medical attention, care, or treatment.

Patient may also refer to:
 Patient (grammar), in linguistics, the participant of a situation upon whom an action is carried out

Publications
 Patient (memoir), a book by Ben Watt
 The Patient: Patient-Centered Outcomes Research, a medical journal

Film and TV
 Patient (film), a 2016 American thriller film
 Patients (film), a 2016 French drama film
 "The Patient (Miracles)", an episode of the TV series Miracles
 The Patient, a 2022 American streaming thriller TV series

Music
 Patient, a 1999 album by Bluebottle Kiss

Songs
 "Patient", a song by Peter Hammill from his 1983 album Patience
 "Patient", a song by Klinik from their 1992 album Contrast
 "Patient", a song by Corpus Delicti from their 1994 album Sylphes
 "The Patient", a song by Fine China from their 2000 album When The World Sings
 "The Patient", a song by Tool from their 2001 album Lateralus
 "Patient", a song by Post Malone from his 2016 album Stoney
 "The Patient", a song by Lala Hsu from her 2017 album The Inner Me

See also
 Patient UK, a health website
"Patiently", a song by Journey	from their 1978	album Infinity
 "Patiently", a song by 10 Years from Division
Patience (disambiguation)
Outpatients (band) - an American rock band